Alessio di Mauro and Simone Vagnozzi were the defending champions, but Vagnozzi decided not to participate.
di Mauro partnered with Alessandro Motti, but they lost to Diego Junqueira and Gabriel Trujillo-Soler in the quarterfinals.
Robin Haase and Thomas Schoorel won the title, defeating Diego Junqueira and Gabriel Trujillo-Soler 6–4, 6–4 in the finals.

Seeds

Draw

Draw

External links
 Main Draw

Antonio Savoldi-Marco Co - Trofeo Dimmidisi - Doubles
Antonio Savoldi–Marco Cò – Trofeo Dimmidisì